The men's 10,000 metres event at the 2006 African Championships in Athletics was held at the Stade Germain Comarmond on August 13.

Results

References
Results 

2006 African Championships in Athletics
10,000 metres at the African Championships in Athletics